Lerbach may refer to:

 Lerbach, Osterode am Harz, a village of Osterode am Harz in Lower Saxony, Germany
 Lerbach (Söse), a river of Lower Saxony, Germany, tributary of the Söse